Svetlana Anikey (Belarusian Svyatlana Uladzimirauna Anikey, born February 7, 1977, Minsk, Belarusian SSR, USSR) is a Belarusian theater and film actress. She is the actress of the Yanka Kupala National Academic Theatre. Anikey is a recipient of First National Theater Award (2011) and Francysk Skaryna Medal (2020).

Biography 
Anikey was born in Minsk, Belarus, on February 7, 1977.

She graduated from the Akhremchik College of Arts,  and planned to become an artist. On the first attempt, she got accepted to the theater department of the Belarusian State Academy of Arts to study under the guidance of the famous professor Lydia Alekseevna Monakova. 

In 1999, Anikey graduated from the Theater Department of the Belarusian State Academy of Arts. Since 1999, she has been an actress of the Yanka Kupala National Academic Theater. She began acting in films in 2003, making her debut in the film "Hotel ‘Fulfillment of Desires’.“

In 2018, she played one of the leading roles in Radziva Prudok play by Andrus Horvat, which premiered at Yanka Kupala National Academic Theatre and was a great hit with the public. In 2018, she was also in the Crystal Swan movie by Darya Zhuk, the Belarusian entry for the Best Foreign Language Film at the 91st Academy Awards (the Oscars).

In 2020, Anikey played a leading role in Andrei Kureichik's "LIBERTÉ", a philosophical drama featuring Jean-Marc Birkholz and Didier Caness, the Ambassador of France to the Republic of Belarus.

On August 26, 2020, during the protests in Belarus due to the Belarusian Presidential Election falsification and brutal violence against protesters, Anikey resigned from the theater along with 58 actors and supporting staff (the vast majority of the theater's employees). The series of resignations were caused by the firing of the theater's general director, Pavel Latushko, who spoke up against the Lukashenko regime. 

On August 26, 2020, after the mass resignation in solidarity with the Belarusian nation, Anikey along with the actors and staff of the Yanka Kupala National Theatre founded the Free Kupalauski Theater, which continues the long-standing traditions of the national theater, including broadcasting their work for free on their YouTube channel, Kupalaucy. The statement after the resignation was the following: "We have left our home, but we are sure we will come back to it. Our page is about our return, our long way back home."

Besides acting, Anikey restores unique Belarusian wooden furniture from the remote villages.

Films

 Hotel "Fulfillment of Desires" (2003; debut) 
 Eric XIV (film-play; 2004) - Karin, the daughter of Mons
 Death Sculptor (2007) 
 Panther (2007) 
 Your Honor (2007) - Veronica
 Challenge-3 (2008) 
 Challenge-4 (2009) - Alexandra Sergeevna Deryugina
 Semin (2009) - Yulia Kostrikova
 The collapse of the favorite (2009) - Tanya
 Detective Agency "Ivan da Marya" (2009) - Viola
 Quiet Center (2010) - Aliya
 Quiet Pool (2010) - Svetlana
 Mortal Combat (2010) - Drozdov's girlfriend
 Heart to Heart (2010) 
 Revenge (2010) - Vasily's wife
 Captain Gordeev (2010) - Nadezhda Konstantinovna, the teacher of the murdered girl
 Divination by candlelight (2010) 
 Talash (2011) - Taisiya
 Family detective (2011) - Natalya Lapina, accountant
 Novel in Letters (2011) - Dean's Secretary
 Kiss of Socrates (2011) - Inessa Smolova, Leakey's friend
 Navigator (2011) - Tatyana Arkadyevna, Olya's mother
 Once upon a time Love (2011) - Diana, nurse
 White Wolves (2012–2013) - Cecile Noiret, human rights activist
 The heart is not a stone (2012) - Eugene, wife of Nikolai
 The Hunt for the Gauleiter (2012) 
 Hotel for Cinderella (2012) - Tamara, a lady in a fur coat
 Don't Go (2012) - Lida, Nurse
 Mother and Stepmother (2012) - Veronica
 Immediately after the creation of the world (2013) - Lyuba
 Save or Destroy (2013) - translator
 Stepsister (2013) - Arina
 Oh, ma-piss! (2013) - Lyudmila Viktorovna Krylovich, teacher
 On purpose you can't imagine (2013) - Nadia, sister of Yuri
 We swear to protect (2013) - lead teacher
 Leaving Nature (2014) - Assistant Director
 The dream is like life (2014) - a market woman
 A good name (2014) - Julia Sysoeva
 Doctor (2014) - Galina Alexandrovna, Svetlana's friend
 Instead of her (2014) - Natasha, Nastya's mother
 The Far Side of the Moon 2 (2015) - Olga, Sorokin's daughter
 New World (Nowy Świat; 2015) - Irina, "Jeanne" short story
 Incorruptible (2015) - Lyudmila Istomina, Kulikov's secretary
 Star Trap (2015) - Marina, a head waiter
 Housekeeper (2015) - Nina, Olga's friend
 Payback for happiness (2016) - Alina, Ilya's deputy
 I Hate (2016) - Albina Sokolova
 Love out of competition (2016) - Larisa Ivanovna, nanny candidate
 Insidious games (2016) - Lyudmila, entrepreneur
 All Ages of Love (2016) - Jeanne
 Black Blood (2017) - Svetlana
 Swing (2017) - Laura, Garay's wife
 Crystal Swan (2018) - Velya's mother 
 The Elusive Life (2018) - Irina Mitina, Notary
 A hole in the head (2018) 
 Kryostnaya (2019)
 Lake of Happiness (2019)
 Liberte (2020) by Andrei Kureichik - leading role

Awards
 First National Theater Award for Best Actress (2011)
 Top Actor's Award, XV All-Polish Festival of Contemporary Drama "Rzeczywistość przedstawiona" (for the role in the production of A. Korytkowska-Mazur "Sonka", Białystok Drama Theater, 2015) 
 Francysk Skaryna Medal (National Award) (2020)

References

Bibliography 
Svetlana Anikey
Stage actress can’t imagine using acting in her ‘real’ life
Art magazine (founded by the Ministry of Culture) : Actress who dreams to play "Oblomov"
Channel Belarus 24: From Minsk to a village: a leading actress talks about non-random accidents and creative experiments
Nasha Niva: Leading actress will play a glamorous enchantress
Sovetskaya Belorussiya - Belarus Segodnya : Actress with an accent
IMDb Svetlana Anikey
Svetlana Anikey
Шоу ПОДЪЕМ! Светлана Аникей. Смбат Тоноян
 Светлана Аникей: «Если бы я хотела вернуться в Пинск, то в качестве мэра города»

1977 births
Articles with unsourced statements from August 2020
Living people
Belarusian actresses